Methods in Enzymology is a book-series of scientific publications focused primarily on research methods in biochemistry by Academic Press, created by Sidney P. Colowick and Nathan O. Kaplan.

Content 
Historically, each volume has centered on a specific topic of biochemistry, such as DNA repair, yeast genetics, or the biology of nitric oxide. In recent years, however, the range of topics covered has broadened to also include biotechnology-oriented areas of research.

Each Volume and Chapter includes not only background knowledge but also specific research techniques, detailed experimental procedures and methods. Video elements are also present.

History 
First published in 1955, there are (2022) more than 650 volumes in the collection, with ca. 16 new Volumes being published each year.

Editors 
The series is currently edited by Anna Pyle, Yale and David Christianson, Chair of the Department of Chemistry, University of Pennsylvania. Each volume is guest-edited and contributed to by expert researchers in the field (e. g. Biochemists, biophysicists, molecular biologists, analytical chemists or physiologists)

References

Biochemistry journals
Publications established in 1955
1955 establishments in the United States
Academic Press academic journals